Aartje Johanna "Atie" Voorbij (born 20 September 1940) is a retired Dutch butterfly swimmer who won a gold medal in the 4×100 m medley team event (together with Ada den Haan, Cocky Gastelaars and Lenie de Nijs) at the 1958 European Aquatics Championships. She also won a silver medal in 100 m butterfly at the same championships. She participated in the 1960 Summer Olympics and was fifth in 100 m butterfly. Between 1955 and 1960 she was five times national champion in 100 m butterfly and set nine world records in the 100 m butterfly and 4×100 m medley events.

References

1940 births
Living people
Dutch female butterfly swimmers
Olympic swimmers of the Netherlands
Swimmers at the 1960 Summer Olympics
Sportspeople from Hilversum
European Aquatics Championships medalists in swimming
World record setters in swimming
20th-century Dutch women